The Rivalry may refer to the following:

Sports
 Johns Hopkins–Maryland lacrosse rivalry, between the Johns Hopkins Blue Jays and the Maryland Terrapins lacrosse teams
 Calvin–Hope men's basketball rivalry, between the Calvin College Knights and the Hope College Flying Dutch basketball teams
 The Rivalry (Lafayette–Lehigh), American college football between Lafayette College and Lehigh University
 Oxford–Cambridge rivalry, competition between the University of Oxford and the University of Cambridge
 Yankees–Red Sox rivalry, between the Boston Red Sox and New York Yankees
 Michigan–Ohio State football rivalry, between the University of Michigan and Ohio State University
 Carolina–Duke rivalry, between the University of North Carolina and Duke University
 Cowboys–Washington rivalry, between the Dallas Cowboys and Washington Commanders

Other uses
 The Rivalry (album), by German band Running Wild

See also
Rivalry
:Category:Sports rivalries